Stage results and recaps of the 2006 Vuelta a España from Stage 12 to Stage 21.

Stages

Stage 12 - September 13, 2007: Algemesí > Hellín, 167 km.

Stage 13 - September 14, 2007: Hellín > Torre-Pacheco, 150 km.

Stage 14 - September 15, 2007: Puerto Lumbreras > Villacarrillo, 205 km.

Stage 15 September 16, 2007: Villacarrillo > Granada, 205 km.

Stage 16 (after Rest Day 2) September 18, 2007: Jaén > Puertollano, 165 km.

Stage 17, September 19, 2007: Ciudad Real > Talavera de la Reina, 180 km.

Stage 18, September 20, 2007: Talavera de la Reina > Ávila, 154 km.

Stage 19, September 21, 2007: Ávila > Alto de Abantos, 135 km.

Stage 20, September 22, 2007: Villalba, 25 km. (ITT)

Stage 21, September 23, 2007: Rivas Vaciamadrid > Madrid, 100 km.

To meet television schedule, the final course in Madrid had been shortened by one lap, to make the distance only 98 kilometers.

References

External links
cyclingnews

2007 Vuelta a España
2007